Milecastle 12 (Heddon) was a milecastle of the Roman Hadrian's Wall.  Its remains lay under Town Farm, Heddon-on-the-Wall, (just opposite the farm house) with nothing visible on the surface.

Construction 
Milecastle 12 is of unknown axis and gateway types.

Excavations and investigations
circa 1746 - During construction of the Military Road, two inscriptions were discovered (presumed to be from the Heddon-on-the-Wall area).  These attest rebuilding work by the Legio VI Victrix.  One reads "LEG·VI·V·P·F·REF·TER·ET·SAC·COS", referring to Tertullus and Sacerdos (Consuls for 158AD).
1752 – A large hoard of coins in wooden boxes is found here.
1820 – A small hoard of coins is found near here.  These comprise coins from Emperor Maximian (286 – 305 AD) to Emperor Arcadius (383 – 408 AD).
1926 – The north gate is recorded as having been found.
1928–29 – A further search is made, without success.
1966 – English Heritage Field Investigation.  It was noted that there were no surface indications from which the site could be established, and the area was largely covered by modern farm buildings.
1989 – English Heritage Field Investigation.  It was noted that there was no surface trace of the milecastle, though its exact position is unknown.

Associated turrets 
Each milecastle on Hadrian's Wall had two associated turret structures.  These turrets were positioned approximately one-third and two-thirds of a Roman mile to the west of the Milecastle, and would probably have been manned by part of the milecastle's garrison.  The turrets associated with Milecastle 12 are known as Turret 12A and Turret 12B.

Turret 12A
Turret 12A (Heddon West) is located beside (and mainly beneath) the B6318 Military Road a short distance West North West of Heddon-on-the-Wall.  No surface traces are currently visible.

This location was confirmed by a partial excavation in 1930. It was found that the walls were reduced to ground level beyond the edge of the roadway, but had the same plan as Turret 12B. However, the platform (which occupied the South side of the interior of Turrets 12B and 13A), was too badly robbed for any trace to remain.
Location on Ordnance Survey 1:25 000 map:

Turret 12B
Turret 12B (North Lodge) is located beside the Military Road (at a point where the B6318 is diverted away from it, but it still exists as a narrow metaled track).  It was located in 1928, 543 yards from Turret 12a and 529 yards from Milecastle 13.  It was excavated in 1930, and found to be almost identical in plan to Turret 12A.  The platform was rectangular and occupied the south side of the interior.

Location on Ordnance Survey 1:25 000 map:

Monument records

References

Bibliography

External links
  Hadrian's Wall: visiting information English Heritage
 Hadrian's Wall: Archaeological research 1976–2000 English Heritage

12